Edgar García (born February 26, 1985) is a Mexican mixed martial artist. Edgar resides in Calgary, Alberta Canada. At the age of 19 he served with the Canadian Armed Forces until his release at the age of 23.

Mixed martial arts career

WEC

García made his WEC debut on January 25, 2009, facing Hiromitsu Miura at WEC 38. García, being the underdog coming into the fight, managed to knockout Miura out little over a minute into the first round.

Ultimate Fighting Championship

After the folding of the WEC Welterweight division, the Ultimate Fighting Championship picked up his contract and he made his UFC debut at The Ultimate Fighter: United States vs. United Kingdom Finale, losing a controversial split decision to Brad Blackburn. After the decision was read, the fans at the arena booed Blackburn very loudly, and UFC commentator Joe Rogan implied that García should have won the decision.

At UFC 107, García lost to DaMarques Johnson by triangle choke in the first round.  At the conclusion of UFC 107, García was released from the promotion along with Kevin Burns, Shane Nelson and Darrill Schoonover.

Post-UFC
Since leaving the UFC, García has gone 7–1, with his most recent fight being a win over Bellator vet Jordan Smith at Showdown Fights 13 on January 24, 2014.

UFC return
García resigned with the UFC in September 2014.  He faced Héctor Urbina on November 15, 2014 at UFC 180. He lost he bout via submission in the first round.

Garcia was expected to face Andrew Craig on July 15, 2015 at UFC Fight Night 71. However, Garcia was forced from the bout with injury and replaced by promotional newcomer Lyman Good.

Garcia was expected to face Sheldon Westcott on December 10, 2015 at UFC Fight Night 80. However, the pairing was moved to UFC 195 a few weeks later to bolster the card. He lost the fight via TKO in the first round.

Mixed martial arts record

|-
|Loss
| align=center|14–5
| Sheldon Westcott
| TKO (punches)
| UFC 195 
| 
| align=center|1
| align=center|3:12
| Las Vegas, Nevada, United States
|
|-
| Loss
| align=center| 14–4
| Héctor Urbina
| Submission (guillotine choke)
| UFC 180
| 
| align=center| 1
| align=center| 3:38
| Mexico City, Mexico
| 
|-
| Win
| align=center| 14–3
| Jordan Smith
| Decision (split)
| Showdown Fights 13 - Lopez vs. Castillo
| 
| align=center| 3
| align=center| 5:00
| Orem, Utah, United States
| 
|-
| Win
| align=center| 13–3
| Leroy Fornof
| Submission (kimura)
| WFF: Pascua Yaqui Fights 4 
| 
| align=center| 1
| align=center| 1:54
| Tucson, Arizona, United States
| 
|-
| Win
| align=center| 12–3
| Ty Tecumseh
| TKO (punches)
| Desert Rage Full Contact Fighting 11 
| 
| align=center| 1
| align=center| 1:12
| Yuma, Arizona, United States
| 
|-
| Win
| align=center| 11–3
| Patrick Dixon
| Submission (guillotine choke)
| WFF 8: Fight at the Fields 
| 
| align=center| 1
| align=center| 0:32
| Scottsdale, Arizona, United States
| 
|-
| Loss
| align=center| 10–3
| Jacob Ortiz
| KO (punch) 
| Bellator 55
| 
| align=center| 1
| align=center| 4:06
| Yuma, Arizona, United States
| 
|-
| Win
| align=center| 10–2
| Jason Anderson
| TKO (punches)
| Desert Rage Full Contact Fighting 9 
| 
| align=center| 1
| align=center| 0:58
| Yuma, Arizona, United States
| 
|-
| Win
| align=center| 9–2
| Mike Moreno
| Submission (guillotine choke)
| TPF 8: All or Nothing
| 
| align=center| 1
| align=center| 1:47
| Lemoore, California, United States
| 
|-
| Win
| align=center| 8–2
| Alejandro Velasquez
| Submission (triangle choke)
| LAF 1: Border Wars
|  
| align=center| 2
| align=center| 2:16
| Mexicali, Mexico
| 
|-
| Loss
| align=center| 7–2
| DaMarques Johnson
| Submission (triangle choke)
| UFC 107
| 
| align=center| 1
| align=center| 4:03
| Memphis, Tennessee, United States
| 
|-
| Loss
| align=center| 7–1
| Brad Blackburn
| Decision (split)
| The Ultimate Fighter: United States vs. United Kingdom Finale
| 
| align=center| 3
| align=center| 5:00
| Las Vegas, Nevada, United States
| 
|-
| Win
| align=center| 7–0
| Hiromitsu Miura
| KO (punches)
| WEC 38
| 
| align=center| 1
| align=center| 1:18
| San Diego, California, United States
| 
|-
| Win
| align=center| 6–0
| Waylon Kennell
| TKO (punches)
| Total Combat 30
| 
| align=center| 1
| align=center| 3:46
| Alpine, California, United States
| 
|-
| Win
| align=center| 5–0
| Sean Loeffler
| Submission (injury)
| Total Combat: Nevada
| 
| align=center| 1
| align=center| 1:59
| Laughlin, Nevada, United States
| 
|-
| Win
| align=center| 4–0
| Efrain Rodriguez
| KO (punches)
| Total Combat 27
| 
| align=center| 1
| align=center| N/A
| Yuma, Arizona, United States
| 
|-
| Win
| align=center| 3–0
| Jeremy Larsen
| Decision (unanimous)
| Cage Supremacy 3
| 
| align=center| 3
| align=center| 5:00
| Tucson, Arizona, United States
| 
|-
| Win
| align=center| 2–0
| Matt Lagler
| TKO (punches)
| Desert Rage Full Contact Fighting 2
| 
| align=center| 1
| align=center| 2:22
| Mexicali, Mexico
| 
|-
| Win
| align=center| 1–0
| Tony Kalani
| KO (punches)
| Desert Rage Full Contact Fighting 1
| 
| align=center| 1
| align=center| N/A
| 
|

See also
 List of current UFC fighters
 List of male mixed martial artists

References

External links
 Edgar Garcia on Myspace
 
 

American male mixed martial artists
Welterweight mixed martial artists
American mixed martial artists of Mexican descent
People from Houston
People from Yuma, Arizona
Mixed martial artists from Arizona
Mixed martial artists from Texas
Living people
1984 births
Ultimate Fighting Championship male fighters